The 2017 Copa Sevilla was a professional tennis tournament played on clay courts. It was the 20th edition of the tournament which was part of the 2017 ATP Challenger Tour. It took place in Seville, Spain between 4 and 9 September 2017.

Singles main-draw entrants

Seeds

 1 Rankings are as of 28 August 2017.

Other entrants
The following players received wildcards into the singles main draw:
  Nicolás Almagro
  Javier Barranco Cosano
  Alejandro Davidovich Fokina
  Daniel Gimeno Traver

The following player received entry into the singles main draw as a special exempt:
  Corentin Moutet

The following players received entry from the qualifying draw:
  Marc Giner
  Carlos Gómez-Herrera
  Maxime Tabatruong
  Mario Vilella Martínez

The following player received entry as a lucky loser:
  Axel Michon

Champions

Singles

 Félix Auger-Aliassime def.  Íñigo Cervantes 6–7(4–7), 6–3, 6–3.

Doubles

 Pedro Cachín /  Íñigo Cervantes def.  Ivan Gakhov /  David Vega Hernández 7–6(7–5), 3–6, [10–5].

References

2017
2017 ATP Challenger Tour
2017 in Spanish tennis
September 2017 sports events in Europe